The Broome Cable House opened on 9 April 1889 and is now known as the Broome Court House. Constructed in 1879, the facility was used as a cable station until March 1914. It is listed on the Western Australia State Heritage Register.

The building was occupied by November 1889 and included rooms for the cable station and separate living quarters. Vegetable gardens were developed around the building and on the adjacent lot, for use in cooking which was carried out in a separate kitchen building. The kitchen has been demolished but the floor slab remains and is now used for the toilet block and store.

The cable station had a tennis court, a billiard room, and servants to look after the British staff and their guests. It was thus an elegant and attractive place that featured prominently in the early social life of the town.

Cable Beach, where the cable reached land is named after this cable that connected Java to the cable station.

Construction of cable station  
In the late 1880s, the small, former colony settlement of Broome located on Roebuck Bay in the north of Western Australia consisted of two stores and a few scattered houses. It had no road or rail connection to the south of the Colony and depended on limited sea transport for its supplies and communication. It was not until 1872 that Australia was connected overseas by submarine telegraphic cable, when a cable was laid from Banjoewangie in Java to Darwin.  A second cable, paralleling the first, was laid in 1880.  Due to frequent breaks in the cable as a result of submarine volcanic activity, there arose an urgent need to lay a third cable, away from the seismic zone.

In February 1889, a submarine telegraph cable was laid by cable laying ship CS Seine to connect Banjoewangie, Java and Australia and was landed on what is today known as Cable Beach.

Between 3 and 9 March 1889, the prefabricated ironwork and timber making up the building for the cable station was transported to Broome as deck cargo on the CS Seine. Due to depth limitations in Roebuck Bay the material was gradually offloaded onto a smaller pearling vessel, which was being sheltered in Broome over the cyclone season.

It was then taken up the tidal creek, Dampier Creek and unceremoniously thrown overboard at high tide. The sections were then retrieved at low tide, dragged manually up the creek, over the mud and stored on the beach,  prior to being transported to the Station site and erected on the land now bounded by Frederick, Hamersley, Stewart and Weld Streets.

A comment in the Engineers report stated, "that it seemed a pity to treat polished teak in this way, but no other method was practicable and no real harm was done though the appearance suffered a little."  The Chinese who had collected and loaded the teak in Singapore, travelled with it, to erect the house and it was those Chinese labourers who had to cart everything across the mudflats.

Connection between Cable House and cable station 
The underground cable from the Cable House to the cable station was laid on the southern side of MacPherson Road, a road constructed originally for this purpose. The cable then ran down Barlee Street, entering the northwest corner of the cable station at the intersection of Frederick Street and Weld Street. Only a short section of MacPherson Road now remains, being the street that now leads into the Broome International Airport. Barlee Street no longer exists.

History of the building 

Cable station April 1889 to March 1914

Australian Army July 1914 to 1918

Court House 6 September 1921 to present

The building was placed on the Western Australian State Register of Heritage Places in 2001.

The Cable Company Operations 
On the 9th of April 1889 when the first paid cable was sent to London by Mr E Keane of Perth. Many employees of the Eastern Extension, Australasia and China Telegraph Company Limited (E.E.T Co) were recruited at a young age, 15 to 16 years. They were given rigorous training in cable telegraphy and on the satisfactory completion of a probationary period were liable to be transferred to any of the Company’s worldwide network of cable stations and ships. 
The Company set high standards of proficiency and behaviour and failure to maintain them could lead to dismissal. This was made especially difficult given the moral standards of the time and the harsh tropical heat in north west Australia. 
But no matter how difficult the conditions, many operators stayed with the cable service all their working lives.

The end of the Broome cable station 

In 1914 the Broome cable station was taken out of service after being in operation for 25 years when the Eastern Extension, Australasia and China Telegraph Company Limited (referred to as the E.E.T. Company) built a new station at Cottesloe (near Perth, WA) with a cable link to Africa via the Cocos Islands.

It served this purpose until March 1914. Operating for 25 years until closure, most cables were subsequently recovered.

The year 1914 was particularly bad for Broome because the outbreak of war ruined the European market for pearl shell. Many of the men from the town enlisted and there were fears that the German ship Emden would raid Broome and destroy the local wireless station (built in 1913 for ship-to-shore communication).

There was little demand for the property when conditions returned to normal after the war, the buildings the government used for justice purposes were no longer adequate and the cable station was acquired for conversion to a courthouse, which opened on 6 September 1921.

The cable station was purchased from the telegraph company for the sum of 3000 pounds and after a further expenditure of 1100 pounds, converted into a court house.

The size and fabric of the station were not changed and it stands today in 3 acres of landscaped tropical gardens, a magnificent iron and timber building, as an excellent example of 19th century Colonial Architecture. While not of the same high architectural standard, the Tennant Creek OTL Station was completed in 1872 and is still standing today.

Current use 

It is currently used as a court house by the Western Australian Government's Department Of Justice, and the grounds are used for community markets every Saturday during the wet season and every Saturday and Sunday during the dry (tourist season).

See also

References

External links

Telegraph stations in Australia
1889 establishments in Australia
Buildings and structures completed in 1879
State Register of Heritage Places in the Shire of Broome
Buildings and structures in Broome, Western Australia